is a semi-official live album by Saxon, being a legal release but not sanctioned by the band. The recording was made at the first Monsters of Rock festival at Castle Donington on 16 August 1980 but was not released until fifteen years later. It was re-released as Live at Donnington 1980 in 2000.

"Backs to the Wall" had been featured on an official Polydor Records release, compiled from recordings of most of the artists who played that inaugural show.

Track listing
"Motorcycle Man" – 3:42
"Still Fit to Boogie" – 2:43
"Freeway Mad" – 2:24
"Backs to the Wall" – 3:24
"Wheels of Steel" – 4:23
"Bap Shoo Ap" – 6:16
"747 (Strangers in the Night)" – 4:52
"Stallions of the Highway" – 3:19
"Machine Gun" – 5:35
Backstage Interview – 3:01

Songs written by Saxon.

Credits 
Biff Byford – vocals
Graham Oliver – guitar
Paul Quinn – guitar
Steve Dawson – bass guitar
Pete Gill – drums

References

External links
Album page on Angel Air Site

Saxon (band) live albums
1997 live albums
Angel Air albums